Peter H. Wyden (October 2, 1923 – June 27, 1998) was an American journalist and writer.

Early life
Wyden was born Peter Weidenreich, in Berlin to a Jewish family. His mother, Helen (née Silberstein), was a concert singer, and his father, Erich Weidenreich, was a businessman. Franz Weidenreich, German anatomist and physical anthropologist, was one of his uncles.

Wyden attended the Goldschmidt School until he left Nazi Germany for the United States in 1937. After studying at City University of New York, he served with the U.S. Army's Psychological Warfare Division in Europe during World War II. His training at Camp Ritchie places him among the ranks of the Ritchie Boys, a group of Military Intelligence Officers who used their language skills to obtain intel in Europe. In 2021, Peter's son Ron Wyden, a U.S. Senator, was instrumental in creating a senate resolution recognizing the Ritchie Boys for their efforts.

Career
After the war, Wyden began a career in journalism, during which he worked as a reporter for The Wichita Eagle, a feature writer for the St. Louis Post-Dispatch, Washington correspondent for Newsweek magazine, a contributing editor for The Saturday Evening Post in Chicago and San Francisco, articles editor for McCall's, and executive editor for Ladies' Home Journal.

Wyden authored or coauthored nine books, and numerous articles that appeared in major magazines. In 1969, he co-authored with his wife a book on homosexuality entitled Growing Up Straight; the book summed up research on the topic, which suggested homosexuality could be prevented with a close paternal relationship in childhood. His last book, published in 1998, was about schizophrenia; it was based on his personal experience as his son Jeff suffered from the mental disorder.

In 1970, Wyden became a book publisher in New York City and Ridgefield, Connecticut.

Personal life and death
Wyden was married three times. He had two sons, including Ron Wyden, who became a United States senator. He died on June 27, 1998 in Danbury, Connecticut.

Works
 Suburbia's Coddled Kids.  1962.  New Jersey:  Doubleday & Company, Inc.
 The Overweight Society. 1965. New York: Pocket Books. 

 Bay of Pigs – The Untold Story. 1979.  New York: Simon and Schuster.   
 The Passionate War: The Narrative History of the Spanish Civil War. 1983. New York: Simon and Schuster. 1983 
 Day One: Before Hiroshima and After. 1985. New York: Simon and Schuster. 1984 
 Stella: One Woman's True Tale of Evil, Betrayal, and Survival in Hitler's Germany. Anchor Books, 1993. 
 Wall: The Inside Story of Divided Berlin. 1989. Simon and Schuster.

References

1923 births
1998 deaths
American male journalists
American people of German-Jewish descent
Jewish emigrants from Nazi Germany to the United States
Jewish American writers
Writers from Berlin
City University of New York alumni
United States Army personnel of World War II
Ritchie Boys
St. Louis Post-Dispatch people
Newsweek people
The Saturday Evening Post people
Ladies' Home Journal
German male writers
20th-century American writers
20th-century American journalists
20th-century American male writers
20th-century American Jews